Nimaj is a census town in the Jaitaran tehsil of the Pali district of Rajasthan, India. It was a statutory town from 1901 to 1951.

Demographics

The population of Nimaj is 5309 according to the 2001 census. The male population is 2703, while the female population is 2606.

References

 History of Nimaj
 Nimaj Thikana
 ChhatraSagar Camp

Villages in Pali district